Evangelos Gerakakis (born 1871 in Chalkida, Greece; died 1913 in Athens, Greece) was a Greek athlete. He competed at the 1896 Summer Olympics in Athens.

Gerakakis was one of 17 athletes to start the marathon race.  He finished seventh of the nine athletes to have completed the race.

References

External links

 The Olympic Marathon - The History and Drama of Sport's Most Challenging Event

1871 births
1913 deaths
Greek male long-distance runners
Greek male marathon runners
Olympic athletes of Greece
Athletes (track and field) at the 1896 Summer Olympics
19th-century sportsmen
Sportspeople from Chalcis
Date of birth missing
Date of death missing